Reading Knitting Mills is a historic factory building located in Reading, Berks County, Pennsylvania.  It was built in 1891, and expanded in 1898, and about 1920. It is a four-story, 15 bay by 4 bay, brick building with Italianate style influences.  It has a corbelled brick cornice and slate covered gable roof.  It has a brick boiler house annex and one-story addition built in 1898.  The fourth floor was added to the original three-story building about 1920.

It was listed on the National Register of Historic Places in 1982.

References

Industrial buildings and structures on the National Register of Historic Places in Pennsylvania
Italianate architecture in Pennsylvania
Industrial buildings completed in 1891
Industrial buildings completed in 1920
Buildings and structures in Berks County, Pennsylvania
National Register of Historic Places in Reading, Pennsylvania